Project Runway Season 8 is the eighth season of the television show Project Runway.  The season began airing on July 29, 2010, on the Lifetime. After Lifetime cancelled the accompanying series Models of the Runway, Project Runway episodes were extended to 90 minutes in Season 8. This was the first season that episodes were longer than an hour with commercials.

The season included 17 designers at the beginning of the competition. Returning as judges were supermodel Heidi Klum; fashion designer Michael Kors; and Marie Claire fashion director, Nina Garcia. Tim Gunn returned as the workroom mentor to the aspiring designers. Designer Gretchen Jones was the season's winner.

April Johnson, Michael Costello and Mondo Guerra later appeared in Project Runway: All Stars in 2012, with April receiving 10th Place, Michael 3rd, and Mondo winning the competition. Peach Carr, Carlos Casanova and Ivy Higa in the same year, competed in the second season of the All Stars edition placing 13th, 7th and 5th respectively. Ari South (known as Andy on season 8 before transitioning) competed in the third season in 2013, where she was eliminated first, placing 11th.  Valerie Mayen competed in the fifth season in 2016, placing 9th. Casanova and South would go on to participate again in the sixth season of All Stars in 2018, with Casanova placing 16th of 16, while South placed 14th.

Contestants

Designers

: Ari was known as Andy on season 8, prior to transitioning.

Models

Challenges

 The designer won Project Runway Season 8.
 The designer won the challenge.
 The designer was in the top two, but did not win. 
 The designer had one of the highest scores for that challenge, but did not win.
 The designer had one of the lowest scores for that challenge, but was not eliminated.
 The designer was in the bottom two, but was not eliminated.
 The designer lost and was out of the competition.

: This episode was unusual in that there was only 1 high look and 6 bottom looks, instead of 3 high and 3 low.
: This episode only Mondo's and April's looks were the clear high looks from the judges, Michael C and Gretchen, were considered only fine but not judged really as a high or low.
: Ari was known as Andy during her run on season 8 before transitioning.

 The model won Project Runway Season 8.
 The model wore the winning design that challenge.
 The model wore the losing design that challenge.
 The model was eliminated.
 The model withdrew from the competition

: The models were not used in Episode 6.
: Alexandra was chosen by Christopher, but then withdrew from the competition because of a family crisis and Eyen was brought back.
Designer legend
A.J: AT
April: AJ
Ari: AS
Casanova: CA
Christopher: CC
Gretchen: GJ
Ivy: IH
Jason: JT
Kristin: KS
Nicholas: ND
McKell: MM
Michael C.: MC
Michael D.: MD
Mondo: MG
Peach: PC
Sarah: ST
Valerie: VM

Episodes

Notes

References

External links
 
 Project Runway Official Season 8 Episode Guide

Season 08
2010 American television seasons
2010 in fashion